Roger Hall may refer to:
 Roger Hall (playwright) (born 1939), New Zealand playwright
 Roger Hall (artist) (1914–?), British artist
 Roger Lee Hall (born 1942), American composer and musicologist
 Roger Wolcott Hall (1919–2008), American Army officer and spy